The 2007 British Formula 3 International Series was the 57th British Formula 3 International Series season. It commenced on 9 April 2007 and ended on 30 September after twenty two races, with Estonian driver Marko Asmer crowned champion.

Teams and drivers

Calendar

Standings

Championship Class

References

External links
 The official website of the British Formula 3 Championship

British Formula Three Championship seasons
Formula Three season
British
British Formula 3 Championship